Carmen Becerra  (born Carmen Alicia Becerra García December 7, 1977 in Toluca, State of Mexico, Mexico) is a Mexican actress best known for her antagonistic roles as Sara de la Cruz in Querida Enemiga (2008), Adriana in Zacatillo, un lugar en tu corazón (2010) and Marissa in Amorcito Corazón (2011).

Becerra has starred in ten telenovela productions in Mexico.

Personal life
Carmen wanted to be a chef, but she became an actress. She married very young, but she is divorced from her husband and now remarried.

Filmography

Awards and nominations

References

External links

Carmen Becerra Official Site

1977 births
Living people
Mexican telenovela actresses
Mexican television actresses
Actresses from the State of Mexico
20th-century Mexican actresses
21st-century Mexican actresses
People from Toluca